Dur Bash (also Romanized as Dūr-Bāsh) is a village in Ansar Rural District of the Central District of Takab County, West Azerbaijan province, Iran. At the 2006 National Census, its population was 1,067 in 231 households. The following census in 2011 counted 895 people in 251 households. The latest census in 2016 showed a population of 729 people in 219 households; it was the largest village in its rural district.

References 

Takab County

Populated places in West Azerbaijan Province

Populated places in Takab County